James Iqbal is a Pakistani politician who has been a member of the National Assembly of Pakistan since August 2018.

Political career

He was elected to the National Assembly of Pakistan as a candidate of Muttahida Majlis-e-Amal on a reserved seat for minorities in 2018 Pakistani general election.

References

Living people
Muttahida Majlis-e-Amal MNAs
Pakistani MNAs 2018–2023
Year of birth missing (living people)